"Let It Rain (Is There Anybody)" is a song performed by American contemporary Christian music singer Crowder featuring Mandisa. It was released to Christian radio in the United States on May 31, 2019, as the third single from his third studio album, I Know a Ghost (2018). Crowder co-wrote the song with Ed Cash.

"Let It Rain (Is There Anybody)" peaked at No. 10 on the US Hot Christian Songs chart.

Background
On November 2, 2018, Crowder released "Let It Rain (Is There Anybody)" featuring Mandisa as the first promotional single from his studio album I Know a Ghost, concurrently launching the album's pre-order leading up to its release on November 9, 2018. On May 31, 2019, "Let It Rain (Is There Anybody)" impacted Christian radio in the United States, as the third single from the album. Crowder shared the story behind the song, saying:

Composition
The song has "a 70s-soul feel updated with a current R&B soul," with the singers highlighting "the importance of keeping the Lord at the center of everything in your life."

Commercial performance
"Let It Rain (Is There Anybody)" debuted at number 50 on the US Hot Christian Songs chart dated November 24, 2018. The song peaked at number ten on the Hot Christian Songs chart dated September 7, 2019, and spent a total of twenty-six non-consecutive weeks on the chart.

Music videos
Crowder released audio video of "Let It Rain (Is There Anybody)" showcasing the I Know a Ghost album artwork through YouTube on November 2, 2018. Crowder published the lyric video of "Let It Rain (Is There Anybody)" via YouTube on November 9, 2018. On June 7, 2019, Crowder released the official music video for "Let It Rain (Is There Anybody)" featuring Mandisa, filmed at Melrose Billiards Parlor, on YouTube.

Personnel
Credits adapted from Tidal.
 Ed Cash — mixing, producer
 Crowder — primary artist
 Mandisa — featured artist
 Joe LaPorta — mastering

Charts

Weekly charts

Year-end charts

Release history

References

External links
 

2019 singles
2018 songs
Crowder (musician) songs
Mandisa songs
Sparrow Records singles
Songs written by Ed Cash